Mark Turcotte (born 1958) is a Native American poet. He has published two books of poetry, Exploding Chippewas and Feathered Heart. Road Noise, a chapbook was translated into French by the author Dominique Falkner. Illustrations for "Feathered Heart" and the cover art for "Road Noise" were created by Kathleen Presnell. Turcotte is a member of the Turtle Mountain Band of Chippewa Indians.

Turcotte is currently a visiting assistant professor of English at DePaul University in Chicago, IL.

His works
 and Kathleen S. Presnell. Songs of Our Ancestors: Poems About Native Americans. Chicago: Children's Press, 1995.  
 The Feathered Heart. East Lansing: Michigan State University Press, 1998.  
 Road Noise: A Poem. Minneapolis, MN: Mesilla Press, 1998. 
 Exploding Chippewas. Evanston, Ill: TriQuarterly Books, 2002.

References

External links
 Native American Authors
 Mark Turcotte Biography
 DePaul University Department of English Faculty

American male poets
Living people
Native American writers
DePaul University people
Ojibwe people
Chapbook writers
1958 births
20th-century American writers
21st-century American writers
20th-century Native Americans
21st-century Native Americans